The Iranian ambassador in New Delhi is the official representative of the Government in Tehran to the Government of India.

List of representatives

References 

 
India
Iran